Sisyndite is a genus of flowering plants belonging to the family Zygophyllaceae.

Its native range is Southern Africa.

Species
Species:
 Sisyndite spartea E.Mey. ex Sond.

References

Zygophyllaceae
Rosid genera